Abreha and Atsbeha were brothers and Aksumite rulers who were said to have adopted Christianity in the 4th-century, although this claim is dubious. The story of Abreha and Atsbeha is lifted from that of the historical personages King Ezana and his brother Saizana. Stuart Munro-Hay has also speculated that the myth may have emerged from a confusion with two other religious Aksumite figures: Kaleb of Axum, whose throne name was Ella Atsbeha, and Abraha, an Aksumite general who promoted Christianity in Yemen.

According to tradition, Abreha and Atsbeha succeeded Ella Allada to the Aksumite throne. The missionary Frumentius, who had been captured during Ella Allada's reign, converted the brothers to Christianity following which the rest of the kingdom eventually converted. It is claimed they founded 44 churches.

Church 
The Church of Abreha wa-Atsbeha (sometimes spelt Abreha we Atsbeha) was built in East Tigray, around 15 km from Wukro, at some point in the tenth or eleventh century in honour of the brothers. Their bodies are claimed to be entombed in the church. At one time the church served as a monastery but now operates as a parish church. Paul B. Henze visited the church in the 1970s where he was told the ceiling was blackened by soot due to Queen Gudit setting a fire in the building nine centuries earlier.

See also
Christianity in Ethiopia
Axum
List of legendary monarchs of Ethiopia

References

People from the Aksumite Empire
Mythological kings
Christianity in Ethiopia